St. Paul Island is a small uninhabited island located approximately  northeast of Cape North on Cape Breton Island and  southwest of Cape Ray on Newfoundland; it is along the boundary between the Gulf of St. Lawrence and the Cabot Strait.

Overview
An extension of the Appalachian Mountains and the Cape Breton Highlands, the highest point on St. Paul Island is 147 m (485 feet) atop "Croggan Mountain".

St. Paul Island is approximately three miles long by one mile wide at its widest point.  It is formed of granite and is extremely rugged with its shores being completely encircled by rockface cliffs.  It is split by a narrow channel that fills with sea water. The only land mammals inhabiting the island are originally domesticated rabbits, which were set loose after the lifesaving station was established in the late 1800s (the ramp and massive rowboat for 10 men were still there in 1950/51 as well as an enormous house including a dam forming a fresh water reservoir also used by the radio range station operators and families up to the 1950s). The remains of a WWII RCAF radar station were also still there facing the landing area in 1950/51. It is also inhabited by numerous seabirds. There are also two small lakes in the interior stocked with trout. Its ecosystem is considered fragile and due to the danger posed by visiting the island, visits must be cleared beforehand with the Canadian Coast Guard which administers the island on behalf of its owner, the Government of Canada.

The island is nicknamed the "Graveyard of the Gulf" (of St. Lawrence) as it is fog-bound throughout much of the navigation season and posed a significant hazard during the Age of Sail. There is no evidence of its use by indigenous people and it is believed to have been discovered by John Cabot.

A lighthouse was first established on the island in 1839. This lighthouse burned down in 1916. It was replaced by a cast iron cylindrical lighthouse in 1917. This was in turn replaced by an automated system in 1962.

With the light station now automated using solar power, the island sees few visitors, aside from Canadian Coast Guard helicopters on maintenance trips. The island used to host a Marconi wireless station and it still sees occasional amateur radio operators who use the callsign prefix CY9. Other visitors include birdwatchers and SCUBA divers.

The island is an Important Bird Area.

Climate 
St Paul Island experiences a marine influenced subarctic climate (Koppen: Dfc), bordering on a humid continental climate (Dfb). On rare occasions, the temperature can rise rapidly and briefly when southwesterly winds blowing offshore from mainland Cape Breton reach the island.

References

External links
St. Paul Island Information page

Islands of Nova Scotia
Landforms of Victoria County, Nova Scotia
Uninhabited islands of Canada
Important Bird Areas of Nova Scotia